David Lorenz (*March 21, 1856 in Ogrosen, a part of Vetschau, Brandenburg - April 5, 1907 in Ogrosen) was a German painter.

Biography

Lorenz lived in Ogrosen for 32 years, after which he moved to Nürnberg, where he lived for eight years. Following his time there, he moved back to Ogrosen.

Some of his pictures were shown at Haus der Kunst. His most notable work is "Die alte Mühle zu Ogrosen", depicting a water mill in Spreewald.

References
 
Bernhard Weininger: "David Lorenz. Leben und Werk", University of Regensburg
Saur "Allgemeines Künstler Lexikon", Nachtrag Band 1, München, Leipzig, (K. G. Saur Verlag) 2005, p. 49

1856 births
1907 deaths
People from Vetschau
People from the Province of Brandenburg
German male painters
19th-century German painters
19th-century German male artists
20th-century German painters
20th-century German male artists